The 2005 Hurricane Relief 400 was the eleventh round of the 2005 Bridgestone Presents the Champ Car World Series Powered by Ford season, held on September 24, 2005, at the Las Vegas Motor Speedway in Las Vegas, Nevada.  Sébastien Bourdais swept the pole and the race victory.  With the dissolution of the Champ Car World Series in 2008, this was the final Champ Car race to take place on a high-banked oval of more than a mile in length.  Proceeds for the event were donated to Hurricane Katrina and Hurricane Rita relief efforts.

Qualifying results

Race

Caution flags

Notes

 New Race Record Sébastien Bourdais 1:26:22.636
 Average Speed 172.962 mph

Championship standings after the race

Drivers' Championship standings

 Note: Only the top five positions are included.

External links
 Champ Car launches hurricane relief initiative
 Qualifying Results
 Race Results

Las Vegas
Hurricane Relief 400, 2005
Hurricane Relief
21st century in Las Vegas
Hurricane Katrina disaster relief fundraising
Hurricane Relief 400
Hurricane Relief 400 2005